Ivan E. Coyote (born August 11, 1969) is a Canadian spoken word performer, writer, and LGBT advocate. Coyote has won many accolades for their collections of short stories, novels, and films. They also visit schools to tell stories and give writing workshops. The CBC has called Coyote a "gender-bending author who loves telling stories and performing in front of a live audience." Coyote is non-binary and uses singular they pronouns. Many of Coyote's stories are about gender, identity, and social justice. Coyote currently resides in Vancouver, British Columbia.

Career 

Coyote started performing spoken word in 1992, and their work deals with contemporary issues of family, class gender, identity and social justice. In 1996, Coyote co-founded "Taste This", a queer performance troupe with Anna Camilleri, Zoe Eakle, and Lyndell Montgomery. "Taste This" incorporates live music, poetry and story-telling into their performance repertoire. The group disbanded in 2000. In 2001, Coyote briefly taught short fiction at Capilano University in North Vancouver. In 2010 Coyote, Camilleri and Montgomery regrouped as "Swell", and premiered at the 2010 Vancouver Pride in Art Festival.

They joined Arsenal Pulp Press in 2000 and have published 10 books with them. Coyote regularly combines storytelling and music and has worked with a number of musicians including Veda Hille, Dan Mangan and Rae Spoon. Coyote has been a columnist for the gay magazines Xtra! and Xtra! West for a number of years and regularly contributes to The Georgia Straight and CBC Radio.

Coyote has been writer-in-residence of a number of organisations, including Carleton University in 2007, Vancouver Public Library in 2009, the University of Winnipeg in 2011,[6] and the University of Western Ontario in 2012. They also served on the jury of the 2012 Dayne Ogilvie Prize, a literary award for emerging LGBT writers in Canada, selecting Amber Dawn as that year's winner.

In 2009,You Are Here was originally scheduled for a cabaret run at Hysteria: A Festival of Women at Buddies in Bad Times Theatre, but was cancelled in January of that year.

In 2008 they performed spoken word at Montreal's Edgy Women festival and taught a writing workshop.

In 2012, Coyote and Spoon collaborated on Gender Failure, a touring multimedia show in which they performed music and spoken word pieces about their failed attempts at fitting into the gender binary. A performance of Gender Failure, as performed at the 27th London Lesbian & Gay Film Festival, is also available on YouTube. A book based on the show was published by Arsenal Pulp Press in 2014.

On November 14, 2015 Coyote did a TED talk in Vancouver entitled "We all need a safe place to pee," where they discuss the need to have gender neutral bathrooms in all public places.

In 2016, they delivered the Florence Bird Lecture at Carleton University. Their lecture was titled "Neither, Nor: How to Circumnavigate the Gender Binary in Seven Thousand Easy Steps".

In 2020, Coyote performed as part of CBC Gem's Queer Pride Inside special.

Writing 
Coyote has written eleven books: one with Press Gang Publishers and ten with Arsenal Pulp Press. Common themes in their work involve identity, gender, community, and class.

Coyote's first book, Boys Like Her (Press Gang Publishers, 1998), was adapted from a live show that was performed by their theater troop, Taste This.

Close to Spiderman (Arsenal Pulp Press, 2000) and One Man's Trash (Arsenal Pulp Press, 2002) are both collections of stories told by Coyote's grandmother and written by Coyote.

Missed Her (Arsenal Pulp Press, 2010) is another book of compiled short stories. The works were first published in columns with Xtra Vancouver.

One in Every Crowd (Arsenal Pulp Press, 2012) is an anthology of Coyote's work that was put together by the request of high school teachers and librarians who wanted to share Coyote's writing with students. Without more mature parts of their writing, their works could be accepted by school administration and parents. It was specifically composed for queer youth.

Tomboy Survival Guide (Arsenal Pulp Press, 2016), has won the Stonewall Book Award Honor—an award given to outstanding LGBT literature—and has been long-listed for the BC National Award for Canadian Non-Fiction in 2017.

Rebent Sinner (Arsenal Pulp Press, 2019) is a collection of stories and personal essays that has been favourably received. Coyote toured in 2019 with musician Sarah MacDougall, performing selections from the book along with music.

Care Of (Penguin Random House, 2021) is a collection of communications Coyote has received from audience members and the responses they have written in return.

Reception 
Coyote has made significant contributions to the representation of queerness in Canadian literature. Their first collection of short stories, Close to Spider Man, was a finalist for the Danuta Gleed Literary Award for short fiction, and it received widespread acclaim across the Canadian critical community for its semi-autobiographical depiction of young, queer women growing up in the Yukon. Although their short stories received no awards recognition until their collection The Slow Fix was shortlisted for the Lambda Literary Award in 2008, and their collections One Man's Trash and Loose End received similar recognition as their debut, with outlets such as Herizons and the Lambda Book Report which praised the brevity and directness of Coyote's writing as it relates to depictions of the complexities of gender, sexuality, and identity.

Bow Grip, Coyote's only full-length novel, was the winner of the 2007 ReLit Award for Best Fiction and the Stonewall Honor Book Award, as well as being shortlisted for the Ferro Grumley Award. Their 2016 autobiography Tomboy Survival Guide also garnered numerous accolades, having been long-listed for the British Columbia's National Award for Canadian Non-Fiction and winning the 2017 Stonewall Book Award.

Bibliography

References 

20th-century Canadian poets
Canadian spoken word poets
Academic staff of Carleton University
Academic staff of Capilano University
Writers from Whitehorse
Living people
University of Winnipeg alumni
1969 births
Queer writers
Canadian LGBT poets
Canadian anthologists
21st-century Canadian poets
Canadian non-binary writers
21st-century Canadian LGBT people
20th-century Canadian LGBT people